The Galería Güemes is a commercial gallery located on Florida Street in the city of Buenos Aires designed in the art nouveau style by Italian architect Francisco Gianotti in 1913.

Gallery

References

Antoine de Saint-Exupéry lived here in 1931, with a seal in his bathtub. In his room in the gallery, wrote the book Night Flight.
Julio Cortázar in his story El otro cielo, included in his book Todos los fuegos el fuego, imagined together the Guemes and Parisian galleries Vivienne, to both circulate the same air, the air they breathe fantasy the two cities of your life.

External links
 Official site

Buildings and structures in Buenos Aires
Tourist attractions in Buenos Aires
Commercial buildings completed in 1913
Art Nouveau architecture in Buenos Aires
Art Nouveau retail buildings
1913 establishments in Argentina